Alfonso Bialetti (17 June 1888– 4 March 1970) was an Italian engineer who became famous for the invention of the Moka Express coffeemaker. Designed in 1933, the coffee pot has been a style icon since the 1950s. While many variations of the Moka have been developed, including the Bialetti cow-printed Mukka Express (which makes cappuccino), the Moka Express is a time-honoured classic. Bialetti was also the founder of Bialetti Industries, the now giant Italian kitchen-ware company.

The Bialetti Company

Bialetti first acquired his metal-working skills by working for a decade in the French aluminium industry. By 1919 he had established his own metal and machine workshop in Crusinallo (his native Piedmont) to make aluminium products: this was the foundation of the Bialetti company. He transformed his workshop – Alfonso Bialetti & C. Fonderia in Conchiglia – into a studio for design and production.

The Moka Express

Design

Bialetti completed his design for the aluminium Moka Express in 1933. It may also be referred to as a Moka, Moka pot, a Bialetti, a percolator or a stove-top coffeemaker, and in Italian as la Moka, la macchinetta ("the little machine") or la caffettiera. The blueprints for the Moka Express are on display in the London Design Museum.  Bialetti was probably heavily influenced by contemporary designers such as Hoffmann, Puiforcat, Genazzi and Henin; to a certain extent he copied and built upon their coffee-pot designs. The coffee pot's clean classic design with its symmetrical eight-faceted metallic body is easily recognisable—it followed the same design for over 70 years (unusual in a world of constantly changing products). Since its creation the Moka has become the world's most famous coffee pot and has been cited  in the Guinness Book of World Records as well as in various essential design books. The Bialetti design has also provided an inspiration for modern designers; Julian Lwin A New York designer, paid homage to the Moka Express with his own "Dr. Octagon Espresso" set of table and chairs.

The use of aluminium to construct the body of the coffee pot was also a relatively new industrial concept as aluminium was not a traditional "domestic metal". Soon the material was to become more common in kitchens and the mid-1930s are considered to be the golden era in the production of aluminium products for the kitchen. The coming together of coffee and aluminum may have been inevitable, however, it was the Bialetti design together with the use of the novel metal which made the coffee-pot something rather special.

Development and marketing
The Moka was eventually to transform the Bialetti company into a leading Italian coffee-machine designer and manufacturer. Between 1934 and 1940 the humble Moka was only marketed locally – sold by Alfonso at the weekly markets in Piedmont. In these six years he only produced 70,000 units. By 2001 a total of 220 million units had been produced and to date the number has reached 330 million. During World War II the rising prices of coffee and aluminium stalled production of the Bialetti products. It was not until Renato, Alfonso's son, took over in 1946 that the Bialetti product line was narrowed down to a single product: the Moka Express. A huge multi-faceted marketing campaign was initiated by Renato. It incorporated television, billboards which saturated the streets of Milan and even the creation of a giant statue of the Moka Express coffee pot. Copy-cat designs were infiltrating the market by now and advertising turned out to be a key strategy in defining the success of the Moka and ensuring the popularity of the Bialetti brand. L'omino con i baffi – the Moka mascot – was based on a humorous cartoon doodle of Alfonso Bialetti's son Renato. The initial sketches and logo were created in 1953 by Paul Campani. By 1956 the Bialetti company had managed to construct a state-of-the-art factory in Omegna.

Social impact
Espresso machines prior to the Moka Express were large, expensive, and technically complicated. Few people kept them at home, so coffee-drinking was largely a public affair. The Moka Express, which was comparatively small, cheap, and easy to use, made it feasible for many more people to brew espresso at home. Over the rest of the 20th century, it gradually displaced other home coffee makers invented in the late 19th century, such as the Napoletana and the Milanese.

Mechanics of coffee percolation
Aromatic compounds and other flavour compounds are extracted from coffee grains by the Moka using a process known as percolation. In order to percolate or brew the coffee the percolator is placed on a stove element and heated until pressure in the water compartment increases causing the water to rise through a funnel, through the coffee grains, through a filter and, finally, into the top compartment. According to the Bialetti corporate lore the mechanical design for the Moka was inspired by the primitive washing-machines: linens were boiled in tubes built around a central conduit that drew the boiling soapy water up through it and redistributed it across the linen through a radial opening.

Trivia
 Alfonso Bialetti is the grandfather of Alberto Alessi of Alessi (the famous Italian design house).
 Some patents describe this machine as an "apparatus for domestic use to prepare hot drinks by steam jet, in particular to prepare 'Italian Cappuccino'".

See also
Pressure cooking

Notes

External links
 Bialetti.com

20th-century Italian engineers
Italian industrial designers
Italian designers
1888 births
1970 deaths
Bialetti